Johnnie William Schofield (10 March 1889 – 9 September 1955) was a British actor, known for The Middle Watch (1948), Tawny Pipit (1944) and Melody of My Heart (1936).

Early life
John William Schofield was born on 10 March 1889 in Islington, Middlesex, as John William Schofield. He was the eldest son of music hall vocalist Johnnie Schofield (1858–1921) and Laura Purvis (1867–1955).

Death
He died on 9 September 1955 in Marylebone, London.

Selected filmography

 The Pride of the Force (1933, uncredited)
 Hawley's of High Street (1933, uncredited)
 The Outcast (1934, uncredited)
 Keep It Quiet (1934) – George (uncredited)
 The Great Defender (1934) – Power station worker
 Josser on the Farm (1934, uncredited)
 A Real Bloke (1935, uncredited)
 Royal Cavalcade (1935) – Drinker (uncredited)
 Cock o' the North (1935) – Bert Harris
 Jimmy Boy (1935)
 The Mystery of the Mary Celeste (1935) – Peter Tooley
 Father O'Flynn (1935) – Cassidy
 Variety (1935, uncredited)
 Sexton Blake and the Bearded Doctor (1935, uncredited)
 Living Dangerously (1936) – Prisoner
 Melody of My Heart (1936)
 Love in Exile (1936) – Laundry Man (uncredited)
 The Amazing Quest of Ernest Bliss (1936) – Lift Operator (uncredited)
 Song of Freedom (1936)
 The End of the Road (1936) – Jock
 The Song of the Road (1937, uncredited)
 Make-Up (1937) – Publicity Man
 Talking Feet (1937) – Stage Door Keeper (uncredited)
 The Last Adventurers (1937) – Stalk
 Rhythm Racketeer (1937) – Spike
 Sam Small Leaves Town (1937) – Sam Small
 Incident in Shanghai (1938) – Ted Higgins
 I See Ice (1938) – Man In Club Showing George Tricks (uncredited)
 Special Edition (1938) – Horatio Adams
 Lassie from Lancashire (1938) – Cyril
 Night Journey (1938, uncredited)
 Mountains O'Mourne (1938, uncredited)
 Down Our Alley (1939) – Waiter
 The Spy in Black (1939) – Armed Guard of POWs on Ferry (uncredited)
 The Arsenal Stadium Mystery (1939) – Arsenal Doctor
 Contraband (1940) – Waiter at the Cab Drivers' Shelter (uncredited)
 Gaslight (1940) – John (uncredited)
 Let George Do It! (1940) – Solicitous Steward
 Spare a Copper (1940) – Policeman (uncredited)
 Sailors Three (1940) – Officer Reading Heliograph Message (uncredited)
 You Will Remember (1941) – Sheet Music Seller (uncredited)
 Sheepdog of the Hills (1941) – Tom Abbott
 Gert and Daisy's Weekend (1942) – Policeman at Town Hall (uncredited)
 Bob's Your Uncle (1942) – Stationmaster
 The Next of Kin (1942) – Lance-Corporal
 The Day Will Dawn (1942) – Soldier in Fleet Street Pub with Harry (uncredited)
 Uncensored (1942, uncredited)
 The Goose Steps Out (1942) – 1st Observer (uncredited)
 Gert and Daisy Clean Up (1942) – Policeman on Night Duty (uncredited)
 In Which We Serve (1942) – Coxswain
 The Young Mr. Pitt (1942) – Minor Role (uncredited)
 Went the Day Well? (1942) – Joe Garbett
 The Gentle Sex (1943) – Sgt. in Dance Cafe (uncredited)
 We Dive at Dawn (1943) – Policeman in Chip Shop (uncredited)
 The Bells Go Down (1943) – Milkman
 Old Mother Riley Detective (1943) – P.C. Jimmy Green
 Theatre Royal (1943) – Fred (uncredited)
 I'll Walk Beside You (1943) – Porter
 The Flemish Farm (1943) – Road Gang Worker (Who Passes Message) (uncredited)
 Millions Like Us (1943) – George, The Crowsons' Next-Door Neighbour (uncredited)
 The Demi-Paradise (1943) – Ernie
 Up with the Lark (1943) – Mr. Tanner
 The New Lot (1943) – Homeguard Sgt. (uncredited)
 Down Melody Lane (1943) – Sam Mitchell
 Tawny Pipit (1944) – Sergeant Dawkins
 Fanny by Gaslight (1944) – Joe (uncredited)
 Welcome, Mr. Washington (1944) – Butcher (uncredited)
 The Way Ahead (1944) – Lewis Gun Instructor (uncredited)
 English Without Tears (1944) – Police Sergeant
 They Came to a City (1944) – Bert the barman (uncredited)
 Love Story (1944) – Bus Passenger (uncredited)
 Waterloo Road (1945) – George, Pub Landlord (uncredited)
 Blithe Spirit (1945) – R.A.C. Man Directing Traffic (uncredited)
 Give Me the Stars (1945) – Ted James
 The Way to the Stars (1945) – Jones
 Perfect Strangers (1945) – Seaman Issuing Messdeck Rations (uncredited)
 The Rake's Progress (1945) – Hotel Bellboy (uncredited)
 The Echo Murders (1945) – Purvis
 The Voice Within (1946) – Lorry Driver
 Night Boat to Dublin (1946) – Factory Watchman (uncredited)
 Wanted for Murder (1946) – Chip Shop Owner (uncredited)
 I See a Dark Stranger (1946) – Villager (uncredited)
 This Man Is Mine (1946, uncredited)
 Code of Scotland Yard (1947) – Inspector Robson
 Dancing with Crime (1947) – Fred (uncredited)
 So Well Remembered (1947) – 1st Publican (uncredited)
 Captain Boycott (1947) – British Soldier in Bar (uncredited)
 While I Live (1947) – Alfie
 The Mark of Cain (1947) – Chemist (uncredited)
 So Evil My Love (1948) – Railway Porter (uncredited)
 My Brother Jonathan (1948) – Trade Union Man
 Mr. Perrin and Mr. Traill (1948) – Barman
 Love in Waiting (1948) – Inspector Bates
 A Piece of Cake (1948) – Window Cleaner
 For Them That Trespass (1949) – Warder In Condemned Cell (uncredited)
 The Perfect Woman (1949) – Ticket Collector
 Train of Events (1949) – First Aid Man at Crash Site (uncredited)
 Dark Secret (1949) – Motor Coachman (uncredited)
 The Rocking Horse Winner (1949) – 1st Chauffeur (uncredited)
 The 20 Questions Murder Mystery (1950)
 The Reluctant Widow (1950)
 Night and the City (1950) – Cashier (uncredited)
 Trio (1950) – Minor Role (uncredited)
 The Second Mate (1950, uncredited)
 Blackmailed (1951) – Maurice's Taxi Driver
 A Tale of Five Cities (1951) – Commissionaire (uncredited)
 The Browning Version (1951) – Taxi Driver (uncredited)
 White Corridors (1951) – Night Porter
 Lady Godiva Rides Again (1951) – Shooting Stall Keeper at British Festival (uncredited)
 I Believe in You (1952) – Jim, Lorry Driver (uncredited)
 Home at Seven (1952) – Joe Dobson, Landlord of the Feathers (uncredited)
 Something Money Can't Buy (1952) – Irish Policeman (uncredited)
 The Gentle Gunman (1952) – ARP Warden at Tube Station (uncredited)
 The Voice of Merrill (1952) – Night Porter
 Three Steps to the Gallows (1953) – Charley
 The Net (1953) – Jim Barnes (uncredited)
 The Fake (1953) – Tate Gallery Attendant (uncredited)
 The Square Ring (1953) – Seating Attendant (uncredited)
 Wheel of Fate (1953) – Len Bright
 The Final Test (1953) – Railway Porter (uncredited)
 Meet Mr. Lucifer (1953) – Trap Door Stage Hand (uncredited)
 Small Town Story (1953, uncredited)
 Solution by Phone (1954, uncredited)
 The Scarlet Web (1954, uncredited)
 The Belles of St. Trinian's (1954) – Spider (uncredited)
 Carrington V.C. (1954) – Hallam (uncredited)
 See How They Run (1955, uncredited; final film role)

Theatre Performances

As Corporal Cramp: 'Love Goes To Press'
22nd July – 24th August 1946, Duchess Theatre, London.
As Phil Emerald: 'Zero Hour'
14th – 19th June 1944, Lyric Theatre (Hammersmith) (Shaftesbury Ave), London.
As Phil Emerald: 'Zero Hour'
2nd May, 1944, Duke of York's Theatre, London.
As Humpty Dumpty,
1927/'28, Prince's Theatre, Bristol
Goldilocks and the Three Bears
1924/'25, Prince’s Theatre, Bristol.

References

External links
 

1889 births
1955 deaths
British male film actors
People from Islington (district)
20th-century British male actors